And Then There Were None is a mystery novel by the English writer Agatha Christie, described by her as the most difficult of her books to write. It was first published in the United Kingdom by the Collins Crime Club on 6 November 1939, as Ten Little Niggers,<ref name="vuyqxh">{{cite news|work=The Observer|title=Review of Ten Little Niggers |date=5 November 1939|page=6}}</ref> after the children's counting rhyme and minstrel song, which serves as a major plot element. The US edition was released in January 1940 with the title And Then There Were None, taken from the last five words of the song. Successive American reprints and adaptations use that title, though Pocket Books paperbacks used the title Ten Little Indians between 1964 and 1986. UK editions continued to use the original title until 1985.

The book is the world's best-selling mystery, and with over 100 million copies sold is one of the best-selling books of all time. The novel has been listed as the sixth best-selling title (any language, including reference works).

 Plot These details correspond to the text of the 1939 first edition.Eight people arrive on a small, isolated island off the Devon coast, each having received an unexpected personal invitation. They are met by the butler and cook/housekeeper, Thomas and Ethel Rogers, who explain that their hosts, Ulick Norman Owen and Una Nancy Owen, have not yet arrived, though they have left instructions.

A framed copy of an old rhyme hangs in every guest's room, and on the dining room table sit ten figurines. After supper, a phonograph record is played; the recording accuses each visitor and Mr and Mrs Rogers of having committed murder, then asks if any of the "prisoners at the bar" wishes to offer a defence.

The guests discover that none of them know the Owens, and Mr Justice Wargrave suggests that the name "U N Owen" is a play on "Unknown". Marston finishes his drink and promptly dies of cyanide poisoning. Dr Armstrong confirms that there was no cyanide in the other drinks and suggests that Marston must have dosed himself.

The next morning, Mrs Rogers is found dead in her bed, and by lunchtime, General MacArthur has also died from a heavy blow to the head. The guests realise that the nature of the deaths corresponds with the respective lines of the rhyme, and three of the figurines are found to be missing.

The guests suspect that U N Owen may be systematically murdering them and search the island, but find no hiding places. Since no one else could have arrived or departed the island unassisted, they are forced to conclude that one of the seven remaining persons must be the killer. The next morning, Mr Rogers is found dead at the woodpile, and Emily Brent is found dead in the drawing room, having been injected with potassium cyanide.

After Wargrave suggests searching all the rooms, Lombard's gun is found to be missing. Vera Claythorne goes up to her room and screams when she finds seaweed hanging from the ceiling. Most of the remaining guests rush upstairs; when they return they find Wargrave still downstairs, crudely dressed in the attire of a judge with a gunshot wound to the forehead. Dr Armstrong pronounces him dead.

That night, Lombard's gun is returned, and Blore sees someone leaving the house. Armstrong is absent from his room. Vera, Blore, and Lombard decide to stick together and leave the house. When Blore returns for food, he is killed by a marble clock shaped like a bear that is pushed from Vera's window sill. Vera and Lombard find Armstrong's body washed up on the beach, and each concludes the other must be responsible. Vera suggests moving the body from the shore as a mark of respect, but this is a pretext to acquire Lombard's gun. When Lombard lunges for it, she shoots him dead.

Vera returns to the house in a shaken, post-traumatic state. She finds a noose and chair arranged in her room and a powerful smell of the sea. Overcome by guilt, she hangs herself in accordance with the last line of the rhyme.

Scotland Yard officials arrive on the island to find nobody alive. They discover that the island's owner, a sleazy lawyer and drug trafficker called Isaac Morris, had arranged the invitations and ordered the recording. However, he had died of a barbiturate overdose on the night the guests arrived. The police reconstruct the deaths with the help of the victims' diaries and a coroner's report. They are able to eliminate several suspects due to the circumstances of their deaths and items being moved afterward, but ultimately they cannot identify the killer.

Much later, a trawler hauls up in its nets a bottle containing a written confession. In it, Mr Justice Wargrave recounts that all his life he had had two contradictory impulses: a strong sense of justice and a savage bloodlust. He had satisfied both through his profession as a criminal judge, sentencing murderers to death following their trial. After receiving a diagnosis of a terminal illness, he decided to put into effect a private scheme to deal with a group of people he considered to have escaped justice.

Before departing for the island, he had given Morris a lethal dose of barbiturates for his indigestion. He had faked his death by gunshot with the assistance of Dr Armstrong under the pretext that it would help the group identify the killer. After killing Armstrong and the other remaining guests and moving objects to confuse the police, he finally committed suicide by shooting himself in the head, using the gun and some elastic to ensure that his true death matched the account of his staged death recorded in the guests' diaries. Wargrave had written his confession and thrown it into the sea in a bottle in response to what he acknowledged to be his "pitiful human need" for recognition.

 Main characters 
 Anthony James Marston (Tony Marston), an amoral and irresponsible young man
 Thomas Rogers, the butler and Ethel Rogers' domineering husband
 Ethel Rogers, the cook/housekeeper and Thomas Rogers' wife
 General John Gordon MacArthur, a retired World War I war hero
 Emily Caroline Brent, an elderly, pious spinster
 Edward George Armstrong, a Harley Street doctor
 William Henry Blore, a former police inspector, now a private investigator
 Philip Lombard, a soldier of fortune
 Vera Elizabeth Claythorne, a young woman on leave from her position as a sports mistress at a girls' school
 Lawrence John Wargrave (Mr Justice Wargrave), a retired criminal judge
 Isaac Morris, the island's owner, a sleazy lawyer and drug trafficker

 Structure of the novel 
The plot is structured around the ten lines of the children's counting rhyme "Ten Little Niggers" ("Ten Little Indians" or "Ten Little Soldiers" in later editions). Each of the ten victims – eight guests plus the island's two caretakers – is killed in a manner which reflects one of the lines of the rhyme. The recent owner of the island is also killed, but on the mainland and before the story begins.

 Current published version of the rhyme 

This is the version of the rhyme as published in a 2008 edition:

 Correspondence between rhyme and modes of death 

Literary significance and reception
Writing for The Times Literary Supplement of 11 November 1939, Maurice Percy Ashley stated, "If her latest story has scarcely any detection in it there is no scarcity of murders... There is a certain feeling of monotony inescapable in the regularity of the deaths which is better suited to a serialized newspaper story than a full-length novel. Yet there is an ingenious problem to solve in naming the murderer", he continued. "It will be an extremely astute reader who guesses correctly."

For The New York Times Book Review (25 February 1940), Isaac Anderson has arrived to the point where "the voice" accuses the ten "guests" of their past crimes, which have all resulted in the deaths of humans, and then said, "When you read what happens after that you will not believe it, but you will keep on reading, and as one incredible event is followed by another even more incredible you will still keep on reading. The whole thing is utterly impossible and utterly fascinating. It is the most baffling mystery that Agatha Christie has ever written, and if any other writer has ever surpassed it for sheer puzzlement the name escapes our memory. We are referring, of course, to mysteries that have logical explanations, as this one has. It is a tall story, to be sure, but it could have happened."

Many compared the book to her 1926 novel The Murder of Roger Ackroyd. For instance, an unnamed reviewer in the Toronto Daily Star of 16 March 1940 said, "Others have written better mysteries than Agatha Christie, but no one can touch her for ingenious plot and surprise ending. With And Then There Were None... she is at her most ingenious and most surprising... is, indeed, considerably above the standard of her last few works and close to the Roger Ackroyd level."

Other critics laud the use of plot twists and surprise endings. Maurice Richardson wrote a rhapsodic review in The Observer issue of 5 November 1939 which began, "No wonder Agatha Christie's latest has sent her publishers into a vatic trance. We will refrain, however, from any invidious comparisons with Roger Ackroyd and be content with saying that Ten Little Niggers is one of the very best, most genuinely bewildering Christies yet written. We will also have to refrain from reviewing it thoroughly, as it is so full of shocks that even the mildest revelation would spoil some surprise from somebody, and I am sure that you would rather have your entertainment kept fresh than criticism pure." After stating the set-up of the plot, Richardson concluded, "Story telling and characterisation are right at the top of Mrs Christie's baleful form. Her plot may be highly artificial, but it is neat, brilliantly cunning, soundly constructed, and free from any of those red-herring false trails which sometimes disfigure her work."

Robert Barnard, a recent critic, concurred with the reviews, describing the book as "Suspenseful and menacing detective-story-cum-thriller. The closed setting with the succession of deaths is here taken to its logical conclusion, and the dangers of ludicrousness and sheer reader-disbelief are skillfully avoided. Probably the best-known Christie, and justifiably among the most popular."

The original title of the mystery (Ten Little Niggers) was changed because it was offensive.  Alison Light, a literary critic and feminist scholar, opined that Christie's original title and the setting on "Nigger Island" (later changed to "Indian Island" and "Soldier Island", variously) were integral to the work. These aspects of the novel, she argued, "could be relied upon automatically to conjure up a thrilling 'otherness', a place where revelations about the 'dark side' of the English would be appropriate." Unlike novels such as Heart of Darkness, "Christie's location is both more domesticated and privatized, taking for granted the construction of racial fears woven into psychic life as early as the nursery. If her story suggests how easy it is to play upon such fears, it is also a reminder of how intimately tied they are to sources of pleasure and enjoyment."

In 1990 Crime Writers' Association ranked And Then There Were None 19th in their The Top 100 Crime Novels of All Time list. In 1995 in a similar list Mystery Writers of America ranked the novel 10th. In September 2015, to mark her 125th birthday, And Then There Were None was named the "World's Favourite Christie" in a vote sponsored by the author's estate.

In the "Binge!" article of Entertainment Weekly Issue #1343-44 (26 December 2014–3 January 2015), the writers picked And Then There Were None as an "EW favorite" on the list of the "Nine Great Christie Novels".

Christie's own assessment
"I had written the book Ten Little Niggers because it was so difficult to do that the idea had fascinated me. Ten people had to die without it becoming ridiculous or the murderer being obvious. I wrote the book after a tremendous amount of planning, and I was pleased with what I had made of it. It was clear, straightforward, baffling, and yet had a perfectly reasonable explanation; in fact, it had to have an epilogue in order to explain it. It was well received and reviewed, but the person who was really pleased with it was myself, for I knew better than any critic how difficult it had been... I don't say it is the play or book of mine that I like best, or even that I think it is my best, but I do think in some ways that it is a better piece of craftsmanship than anything else I have written."

 19th-century original verses 
The rhyme used by Christie was derived from older minstrel songs of the 19th century, one in Britain in 1869 and one in the US in 1868. 

1869 & 1868 verses

Publication history
The novel has a long and noteworthy history of publication. It is a continuously best selling novel in English and in translation to other languages since its initial publication. From the start, in English, it was published under two different titles, due to different sensitivity to the author's title and counting-rhyme theme in the UK and in the US at first publication.

The novel was originally published in late 1939 and early 1940 almost simultaneously, in the United Kingdom and the United States.  The serialization was in 23 parts in the Daily Express from Tuesday 6 June to Saturday 1 July 1939. All of the instalments carried an illustration by "Prescott" with the first having an illustration of Burgh Island in Devon which inspired the setting of the story. The serialized version did not contain any chapter divisions. The book retailed for seven shillings and six pence.

Title

In the UK it appeared under the title Ten Little Niggers, in book and newspaper serialized formats. In the United States it was published under the title And Then There Were None, in both book and serial formats. Both of the original US publications changed the title from that originally used in the UK, due to the offensiveness of the word in American culture, where it was more widely perceived as a racially loaded ethnic slur or insult compared to the contemporaneous culture in the United Kingdom. The serialized version appeared in the Saturday Evening Post in seven parts from 20 May (Volume 211, Number 47) to 1 July 1939 (Volume 212, Number 1) with illustrations by Henry Raleigh, and the book was published in January 1940 by Dodd, Mead and Company for $2.

In the original UK novel, and in succeeding publications until 1985, all references to "Indians" or "Soldiers" were originally "Nigger", including the island's name, the pivotal rhyme found by the visitors, and the ten figurines. (In Chapter 7, Vera Claythorne becomes semi-hysterical at the mention by Miss Brent of "our black brothers", which is understandable only in the context of the original name.) UK editions continued to use the original title until the current definitive title appeared with a reprint of the 1963 Fontana Paperback in 1985.

The word "nigger" was already racially offensive in the United States by the start of the 20th century, and therefore the book's first US edition and first serialization changed the title to And Then There Were None and removed all references to the word from the book, as did the 1945 motion picture (except that the first US edition retained 'nigger in the woodpile' in chapter 2 part VIII). Sensitivity to the original title of the novel was remarked by Sadie Stein in 2016, commenting on a BBC mini series with the title And Then There Were None, where she noted that "[E]ven in 1939, this title was considered too offensive for American publication." In general, "Christie’s work is not known for its racial sensitivity, and by modern standards her oeuvre is rife with casual Orientalism." The original title was based on a rhyme from minstrel shows and children's games. Stein quotes Alison Light as to the power of the original name of the island in the novel, Nigger Island, "to conjure up a thrilling 'otherness', a place where revelations about the 'dark side' of the English would be appropriate". Light goes on to say that "Christie's location [the island] is both more domesticated and privatised, taking for granted the construction of racial fears woven into psychic life as early as the nursery." Speaking of the "widely known" 1945 film, Stein added that "we’re merely faced with fantastic amounts of violence, and a rhyme so macabre and distressing one doesn't hear it now outside of the Agatha Christie context." She felt that the original title of the novel in the UK, seen now, "jars, viscerally".

Best-selling crime novelAnd Then There Were None is the best-selling crime novel of all time, and made Agatha Christie the best-selling novelist, according to the Agatha Christie Estate.

It is Christie's best-selling novel, with more than 100 million copies sold; it is also the world's best-selling mystery and one of the best-selling books of all time. Publications International lists the novel as the sixth best-selling title.

Editions in English
The book and its adaptations have been released under various new names since the original publication, including Ten Little Indians (1946 play, Broadway performance and 1964 paperback book), Ten Little Soldiers, and official title per the Agatha Christie Limited website, And Then There Were None. UK editions continued to use the work's original title until the 1980s; the first UK edition to use the alternative title And Then There Were None appeared in 1985 with a reprint of the 1963 Fontana Paperback. 
  Hardback, 256 pp. First edition.
  Hardback, 264 pp. First US edition.
 Christie, Agatha (1944). And Then There Were None. New York: Pocket Books (Pocket number 261). Paperback, 173 pp.
 Christie, Agatha (1947). Ten Little Niggers. London: Pan Books (Pan number 4). Paperback, 190 pp.
 Christie, Agatha (1958). Ten Little Niggers. London: Penguin Books (Penguin number 1256). Paperback, 201 pp.
  Paperback, 190 pp. The 1985 reprint was the first UK publication of the novel under the title And Then There Were None.
  First publication of novel as Ten Little Indians.
 Christie, Agatha (1964). And Then There Were None. New York: Washington Square Press. Paperback, teacher's edition.
  Collected works, Hardback, 252 pp. (Except for reprints of the 1963 Fontana paperback, this was one of the last English-language publications of the novel under the title Ten Little Niggers.)
  Late use of the original title in an Australian edition.
  Last publication of novel under the title Ten Little Indians.

Foreign-language editions
Many older translations were based on the original British text, although the word used to translate nigger was often somewhat less offensive, more analogous to English negro or negrito. Languages where the most recent edition retains racial epithets include Spanish, Greek, Serbian, Bulgarian, Romanian, Russian and Hungarian, as well as the 1987 Soviet film adaptation Desyat Negrityat. Changes similar to those in the British edition in the 1980s were made to the German novel in 2003, after 2002 protests in Hanover against a stage version using the old title. Similar changes were made in Dutch in 2004, Swedish in 2007, Brazilian Portuguese in 2009, Polish in 2017, French in 2020, and Turkish in 2022. In 1999, the Slovak National Theatre changed the title of a stage adaptation mid-run. The estate of Agatha Christie now offers it under only one title in English, And Then There Were None, and translations increasingly use the equivalent of this as their title. The Finnish translation  ("No one was saved") in 1940 had its title taken from the American first edition, before being renamed  ("Ten little negro boys") in 1968. This change was reversed in 2003.

Possible inspirations
The 1930 novel The Invisible Host by Gwen Bristow and Bruce Manning has a plot that strongly matches that of Christie's later novel, including a recorded voice announcing to the guests that their sins will be visited upon them by death. The Invisible Host was adapted as the 1930 Broadway play The Ninth Guest by Owen Davis, which itself was adapted as the 1934 film The Ninth Guest. There is no evidence Christie saw either the play (which had a brief run on Broadway) or the film.

The 1933 K.B.S. Productions Sherlock Holmes film A Study in Scarlet follows a strikingly similar plot; it includes a scene where Holmes is shown a card with the hint: "Six little Indians...bee stung one and then there were five". In this case, the rhyme refers to "Ten Little Fat Boys". (The film's plot bears no resemblance to Arthur Conan Doyle's original story of the same name.) The author of the movie's screenplay, Robert Florey, "doubted that [Christie] had seen A Study in Scarlet, but he regarded it as a compliment if it had helped inspire her".

AdaptationsAnd Then There Were None has had more adaptations than any other work by Agatha Christie. Christie herself changed the bleak ending to a more palatable one for theatre audiences when she adapted the novel for the stage in 1943. Many adaptations incorporate changes to the story, such as using Christie's alternative ending from her stage play or changing the setting to locations other than an island.

Film
There have been numerous film adaptations of the novel:
 And Then There Were None (1945 film), American film by René Clair
 Ten Little Indians (1965 film), British film directed by George Pollock and produced by Harry Alan Towers; Pollock had previously handled four Miss Marple films starring Margaret Rutherford. Set in a mountain retreat in Austria.
 Gumnaam (1965, translation: Unknown or Anonymous), an Indian suspense thriller. This loose, uncredited Hindi film adaptation added the characteristic "Bollywood" elements of comedy, music and dance to Christie's plot.
 Nadu Iravil (1970, translation: In the middle of the night), a Tamil adaptation directed by S. Balachander
 And Then There Were None (1974), the first English-language colour version, directed by Peter Collinson and produced by Harry Alan Towers. Based on a screenplay by Towers (writing as "Peter Welbeck"), who co-wrote the screenplay for the 1965 film. Set at a grand hotel in the Iranian desert.
 Ten Little Indians, a 1981 Filipino production in Tagalog, starring William Martinez and Herbert Bautista
 Ten Little Maidens, a 1985 adult film starring Nina Hartley, Amber Lynn, Eric Edwards, Harry Reems and Ginger Lynn
 Desyat' Negrityat (1987, Eng: "Ten Little Negroes") a Russian adaptation produced/directed by Stanislav Govorukhin, notable for being the first cinema adaptation to keep the novel's original plot and grim ending.
 Ten Little Indians, a 1989 British version, produced by Harry Alan Towers and directed by Alan Birkinshaw, set on safari in the African savannah
 Aduthathu, a 2012 Tamil adaptation
 Aatagara, a 2015 Kannada adaptation

Radio
The BBC broadcast Ten Little Niggers (1947), adapted by Ayton Whitaker, first aired as a Monday Matinee on the BBC Home Service on 27 December 1947 and as Saturday Night Theatre on the BBC Light Programme on 29 December.

On 13 November 2010, as part of its Saturday Play series, BBC Radio 4 broadcast a 90-minute adaptation written by Joy Wilkinson. The production was directed by Mary Peate and featured Geoffrey Whitehead as Mr Justice Wargrave, Lyndsey Marshal as Vera Claythorne, Alex Wyndham as Philip Lombard, John Rowe as Dr Armstrong, and Joanna Monro as Emily Brent.

Stage
And Then There Were None (1943 play) is Christie's adaptation of the story for the stage. She and the producers agreed that audiences might not flock to a tale with such a grim ending as the novel, nor would it work well dramatically as there would be no one left to tell the story. Christie reworked the ending for Lombard and Vera to be innocent of the crimes of which they were accused, survive, and fall in love with each other. Some of the names were also changed, e.g., General MacArthur became General McKenzie in both the New York and London productions. By 1943, General Douglas MacArthur was playing a prominent role in the Pacific Theatre of World War II, which may explain the change of the character's name.Ten Little Niggers (1944 play): Dundee Repertory Theatre Company was given special permission to restore the original ending of the novel. The company first performed a stage adaptation of the novel in August 1944 under the UK title of the novel, with Christie credited as the dramatist. It was the first performance in repertory theatre. It was staged again in 1965. There was an article in the Dundee Evening Register in August 1944 about it.And Then There Were None (2005 play): On 14 October 2005, a new version of the play, written by Kevin Elyot and directed by Steven Pimlott, opened at the Gielgud Theatre in London. For this version, Elyot returned to the original story in the novel, restoring the nihilism of the original.

Television
Several variations of the original novel were adapted for television, three of which were British adaptations. The first of these, in 1949, was produced by the BBC. The second was produced in 1959, by ITV. Both of those productions aired with Christie's original title. The third and most recent British adaptation aired as And Then There Were None on BBC One in December 2015, as a drama serial broadcast on three consecutive nights, produced in cooperation with Acorn Media and Agatha Christie Productions. The 2015 production adhered more closely to the original plot, though there were several differences to backstories and actual murders on the island, and was the first English language live-action adaptation to feature an ending similar to that of the novel. It was directed by Craig Viveiros and adapted for television by Sarah Phelps.

An American TV movie aired on NBC 18 January 1959. It was directed by Paul Bogart, and starred Barry Jones and Nina Foch.

There have been many foreign-language TV adaptations:
 A Portuguese-language version for Brazilian television, broadcast 16 February 1957, titled O Caso dos Dez Negrinhos O Caso dos Dez Negrinhos, a 1963 episode of the Brazilian anthology series  A West German television production, Zehn kleine Negerlein, which aired in 1969
 Dix petits nègres, a 1970 episode of the French anthology series  Achra Abid Zghar (1974, translation: Ten Little Slaves), a Télé Liban TV series directed by Jean Fayyad, adapted for television by Latifeh Moultaka
 Deka Mikroi Negroi, a 1978 episode of the Greek anthology series To theatro tis Defteras A free Spanish adaptation made by RTVE in 2011 as the two-parter The mystery of the ten strangers for the second season of Los misterios de Laura (part 1 and part 2)
 Achra Abid Zghar (2014, translation: Ten Little Slaves), an MTV Lebanon television production
 , a two-part Japanese-language adaptation by  set in modern times, aired 25 and 26 March 2017 on TV Asahi in Japan. It was directed by Seiji Izumi and adapted for television by Hideka Nagasaka.
 , a French six-part miniseries produced by M6 and aired in 2020, set on a tropical island in present time

In 2010, American animated TV series Family Guy adapted the story as "And Then There Were Fewer".

Other media
The novel was the inspiration for several video games. For the Apple II, Online Systems released Mystery House in 1980. On the PC, The Adventure Company released Agatha Christie: And Then There Were None in 2005, the first in a series of PC games based on Christie novels. In February 2008, it was ported to the Wii console.

The Japanese visual novel series Umineko When They Cry also drew inspiration from the novel on many fronts. Both stories involve a series of murders on an island during a storm intended to be unsolvable murders where everyone on the island dies. There is a poem that foretells the series of deaths beforehand in both as well. Finally, the solution to both mysteries are tossed into the ocean in the form of messages in a bottle for the reader to learn from at the end of the stories. This is exemplified by the manga version of the series directly referencing And Then There Were None in its last chapter.And Then There Were None was released by HarperCollins as a graphic novel adaptation on 30 April 2009, adapted by François Rivière and illustrated by Frank Leclercq.

Peká Editorial released a board game based on the book, Diez Negritos ("Ten Little Negroes"), created by Judit Hurtado and Fernando Chavarría, and illustrated by Esperanza Peinado.

The 2014 live action comedy-crime and murder mystery TV web series Ten Little Roosters, produced by American company Rooster Teeth, is largely inspired by And Then There Were None.''

Notes

References

External links
 And Then There Were None at the official Agatha Christie website
 Spark Notes for novel
  And Then There Were None BBC Television show official website

1939 British novels
British novels adapted into films
British novels adapted into plays
Collins Crime Club books
Murder–suicide in fiction
Novels adapted into video games
British novels adapted into television shows
Novels adapted into radio programs
Novels by Agatha Christie
Novels first published in serial form
Novels set in the 1930s
Novels set in Devon
Novels set on islands
Works originally published in The Saturday Evening Post
Race-related controversies in literature
Naming controversies